Sheng Zhimin (born 1969) is a Chinese filmmaker from Beijing. Unlike other directors to emerge in recent years, Sheng has had no formal training. He instead began his career as a line producer, screenwriter, and assistant director for other filmmakers like Jia Zhangke, Fruit Chan and Zhang Yang. In these positions, Sheng worked on the films Spicy Love Soup, Durian Durian, Public Toilet, and Platform.

Bliss
Sheng's first, and so far only directorial effort was 2006's Bliss, a family drama set in the central Chinese city of Chongqing.

Bliss premiered at the 2006 Locarno International Film Festival where it won the NETPAC award, and had its North American premiere at the 2006 Toronto International Film Festival. It also screened at the 2007 Shanghai International Film Festival, where it picked up a best picture prize for the New Talent side-competition.

Influences
Sheng lists Martin Scorsese's Raging Bull and Edward Yang's Yi Yi as important influences in his directorial style. He also considers Jia Zhangke, Fruit Chan, and Yasujirō Ozu among his favorite filmmakers.

References

External links

Sheng Zhimin at Cinemasie

Film directors from Beijing
Screenwriters from Beijing
Living people
1969 births